Karen Margaret Synon (born 15 September 1959) is an Australian public servant and former politician. She served as a Senator for Victoria from 1997 to 1999, representing the Liberal Party. She was appointed to the Administrative Appeals Tribunal in 2015.

Early life
Synon was born in Moe, Victoria. She attended Blackburn South High School and Whitehorse Technical School, later completing an MBA at the University of Melbourne.

In 1986, Synon established the Westgate Community Initiatives Group, a non-profit employment services provider based in Melbourne's western suburbs. She served as general manager until 1993, when she took up a position with the Victorian government as director of employment in the Department of State Development.

Politics
Synon joined the Young Liberal Movement at the age of 16. She was active in the Liberal Party of Australia (Victorian Division) for two decades prior to her appointment to the Senate, including as president of the Williamstown branch. She was an ally of Liberal powerbroker Michael Kroger, whom she first met in the Young Liberals during the 1970s.

Senate
Synon was appointed to the Senate in May 1997 to fill the casual vacancy caused by the resignation of Jim Short. She was known for her advocacy of industrial relations reform, welfare reform, and voluntary student unionism. In her maiden speech she spoke against the "entitlement mentality" and "culture of dependency" that she believed had developed in Australia.

Prior to the 1998 federal election, Synon was placed in the "unwinnable" fourth position on the Coalition Senate ticket in Victoria. Her failure to be placed higher was due to her alignment with Michael Kroger and Peter Costello during a time of factional conflict with Jeff Kennett's supporters.

Later career
Synon was appointed to the Refugee Review Tribunal in 2001 and the Migration Review Tribunal in 2004, in both cases as a part-time member. In 2015, she was appointed to a five-year term on the Administrative Appeals Tribunal. In 2019, she was also announced as an independent director of the Australian Housing and Urban Research Institute.

References

1959 births
Living people
Liberal Party of Australia members of the Parliament of Australia
Members of the Australian Senate
Members of the Australian Senate for Victoria
Women members of the Australian Senate
20th-century Australian politicians
20th-century Australian women politicians
University of Melbourne alumni